Pachakutiq (Quechua pacha time, space, kuti return, "return of time", "change of time", pacha kuti "great change or disturbance in the social or political order", -q a suffix, Pachakutiq an Inca emperor, Hispanicized spelling Pachacutec) is a mountain in the Andes of Peru, about  high. It is located in the Puno Region, Lampa Province, Paratía District. Pachakutiq is situated southwest of the mountain Yanawara, west of the lake Sayt'uqucha and north of the mountain Aqup'ukru.

References

Mountains of Puno Region
Mountains of Peru